Not for Ourselves Alone: The Story of Elizabeth Cady Stanton & Susan B. Anthony is a 1999 documentary by Ken Burns produced for National Public Radio and  WETA. The documentary explores the movement for women's suffrage in the United States in the 19th century, focusing on leaders Elizabeth Cady Stanton and Susan B. Anthony. It won a Peabody Award in 1999. It was released on VHS on November 9, 1999.

Events covered in the documentary
 The revolution
 "I wish you were a boy" The status of women in the mid-1850s
 A drudge or a doll
 Connections to the abolitionist movement
 Temperance and reform
 Mental Hunger - the restrictions leading to activism
 The Seneca Falls Convention on women's rights
 "A caged lion" - Susan B. Anthony
 Women's Souls
 The Woman's National Loyal League and the American Civil War
 The 15th amendment and women's rights
 The Revolution (newspaper)
 Done It! Women's rights before the courts
 Spreading the Word
 Making History
 Division and unity - the American Woman Suffrage Association and the NWSA merge
 Self Sovereignty - a philosophy of freedom
 The Woman's Bible - a challenge to religion
 Anthony's death
 The franchise comes

References

External links
 

American documentary films
Films directed by Ken Burns
Documentary films about feminism
Documentary films about United States history
Peabody Award-winning broadcasts
Media about women's suffrage in the United States
Films about activists
Susan B. Anthony
Elizabeth Cady Stanton
1990s American films